Critchfield is a surname. Notable people with the surname include:

 Charles Critchfield (1910–1994), American mathematical physicist at the Los Alamos National Laboratory
 Jack Critchfield (born 1933), Florida Progress Corporation Chairman
 James H. Critchfield (1917–2003), American CIA officer
 Larry Critchfield (1908-1965), NFL player
 Richard Critchfield, American essayist and MacArthur fellow
 Russ Critchfield (born 1946), American former basketball player
 Phil Critchfield (born 1977), American SRE and Firebreather.

See also
 Critchfield, Indiana, unincorporated community in White River Township, Johnson County, Indiana
 Jack Critchfield Park, stadium in Slippery Rock, Pennsylvania